In telecommunication, the term summation check (sum check) has the following meanings: 

A checksum based on the formation of the sum of the digits of a numeral. 
Note: The sum of the individual digits is usually compared with a previously computed value.
A comparison of checksums on the same data on different occasions or on different representations of the data in order to verify data integrity.

References

Error detection and correction